Davide Biale (born 5 April 1994), better known by his online alias Davie504, is an Italian musician and YouTuber. He is best known for playing bass guitar, primarily with a slapping technique, and creating several covers and viral videos.

Career 
Biale began playing bass in high school after being influenced by Kiss bassist Gene Simmons. In 2011, he created a channel named Davie504, and began to upload unconventional cover performances of songs in 2012. Examples of these videos include him using M&M's to cover songs by Eminem, a Korn medley played with corn cobs, and a Red Hot Chili Peppers medley played with actual chili peppers. He also performs musical challenges, which are often suggested to him by comments on his videos, such as playing an uninterrupted slap bass solo for 5 hours, and playing a bassline which Deadmau5 claimed to be "technically impossible".

Biale is also known for uploading meme-related videos and covers. Most notably, he contributed to the PewDiePie vs T-Series competition, where he played a bass cover of "Bitch Lasagna" outside of the T-Series headquarters as well as a video series where he reacts to posts made on his subreddit page. He also participated in a competition with Jared Dines and Steve Terreberry to play the guitar with the most strings.

In 2017, Chowny Bass released the Davie504 signature bass guitar. In May 2019, Biale was listed as number two on MusicRadar's list of "the 20 hottest bassists in the world today". He received his Youtube Gold Play Button later that year, which he turned into a custom bass alongside Amnesia Guitars.

In 2021, Biale was featured on the cover of Bass Player.

In February 2023, Biale performed in a music battle against YouTubers TwoSet Violin at The Star Performing Arts Centre in Singapore, continuing an on-screen feud with the duo since 2020. It was his first-ever live performance.

Personal life 
Biale grew up in Albisola Superiore of Savona, Italy. He attended a university in Genoa before dropping out to focus on his YouTube career. He later studied music production at a college in London. He moved to Brighton in 2017.

Biale's wife, who is also a bassist, is indigenous Taiwanese. They met after she viewed Biale’s content online and connected with him. They were married in October 2022. He lived in Taiwan during the COVID-19 pandemic before relocating to Italy in 2022.

Discography

Studio albums 
 Let's Funk! (2014)
 Funkalicious (2015)
 Very Impressive (2016)

Singles 
"Lighter" (2014)
"Bass Bass Bass" (2020)
"S L A P P" (2020)
"Plastic Bass" (2021)

References 

1994 births
Italian bass guitarists
Italian YouTubers
Living people
Male bass guitarists
Music YouTubers
People from Savona
YouTube channels launched in 2011
Italian expatriates in the United Kingdom